Macedonia (known as Milledgeville in the early 19th century) is an unincorporated community in White County, Tennessee, United States.

References

Unincorporated communities in White County, Tennessee
Unincorporated communities in Tennessee